Jennifer Yu Heung-ying (born 5 July 1993) is a Hong Kong actress, singer, and model.

Personal life
Yu announced in October 2020 that she would be marrying her boyfriend Tim Luk, who is not from the entertainment industry, in November. The following month, Yu announced that she was pregnant. Their daughter, Clare, was born in May 2021.

Selected filmography

 Sisterhood (2016)
 Tracey (2018)
 Distinction (2018)
 Men on the Dragon (2018)
 Far Far Away (2021)

Awards and nominations

References

External links

21st-century Hong Kong actresses
Hong Kong film actresses
1993 births
Living people
Hong Kong female models
21st-century Hong Kong  women singers